Andrey Yudin or Andriy Yudin may refer to:

Andrey Yudin (trampoline gymnast) (born 1996), Russian gymnast and Olympics competitor
Andrey Yuryevich Yudin (born 1967), Russian futsal player and coach
Andriy Yudin (born 1967), Ukrainian footballer and coach